Snakeskin may refer to:
 Snakeskin, a material that is made from the skin of a snake
 Snakeskin (song), a song by Australian band Gyroscope
 Snakeskin (film), a New Zealand film
 Snakeskin (band), a side project of Tilo Wolff from Lacrimosa

See also
 Snakeskin Glacier
 Snakeskin gourami, a species of gourami that is important both as a food fish and as an aquarium fish
 Snakeskin grisette (Amanita ceciliae), a basidiomycete fungus species
 Snake skin hunter slug (Chlamydephorus dimidius), a land slug species endemic to South Africa
 Snakeskin liverwort (Conocephalum conicum), a plant species
 Dr. Snakeskin (aka Darius James, born 1954), an African American author
 The Snake's Skin, a novel by prominent Georgian writer Grigol Robakidze
 Waukon Decorah (c. 1780–1868), a prominent Ho-Chunk warrior and orator during the Winnebago War of 1827 and the Black Hawk War of 1832
 Ichthyosis_vulgaris, a skin disorder causing dry, scaly skin among humans